Charles F. Cooper (1924–1994) was an American born ecologist known for his studies of fire ecology and ecosystem management.

Publications

Cooper, C. F. 1960. Changes in Vegetation, Structure, and Growth of Southwestern Pine Forests since White Settlement. Ecological Monographs 30:129–164. 
Cooper, C. F. 1961. Pattern in Ponderosa Pine Forests. Ecology 42:493–499'Cooper, C. F. 1961. The ecology of fires. WH Freeman.
Cooper, C. F. 1962. Water, in Agriculture and Arid Environments. Ecology 43:175–176. 
Cooper, C. F. 1962. Grazing Practice on Public Lands. Ecology 43:354–355. 
Cooper, C. F. 1963. An Evaluation of Variable Plot Sampling in Shrub and Herbaceous Vegetation. Ecology 44:565–569. 
Cooper, C. F. 1965. Forest Fires and Forest Administration. Ecology 46:221–222. 
Cooper, C. F., & W. C. Jolly 1970. Ecological effects of silver iodide and other weather modification agents: A review, Water Resour. Res., 6(1), 88–98, .
Cooper, C. F. 1973. Tropical Life Zones. Ecology 54:956–957. 
Cooper, C. F. 1977. Energy Paths: Soft and Hard. Ecology 58:1402–1403. 
Cooper, C. F. 1981. A New Series in Applied Ecology. Ecology 62:1696–1696. 
Cooper, C. F. 1983. Carbon storage in managed forests. Can. J. For. Res. 13(1): 155–166
Cooper, C. F. 1985. Ecological Impact Assessment. Ecology 66:1986–1986. 
Cooper, C. F. 1986. Students' Reaction. Ecology 67:583–583. 
Cooper, C. F., Gale, J., LaMarche, V. C., Graybill, D. A., Fritts, H. C. & Rose, M. R. 1986. Carbon Dioxide Enhancement of Tree Growth at High Elevations. Science'' 231(4740): 859-860

References 

1924 births
1994 deaths
American ecologists
Duke University alumni